The Eurocopter AS350 Écureuil (or Squirrel), now Airbus Helicopters H125, is a single-engine light utility helicopter originally designed and manufactured in France by Aérospatiale and Eurocopter (now Airbus Helicopters). In North America, the AS350 is marketed as the AStar. The AS355 Ecureuil 2 is a twin-engine variant, marketed in North America as the TwinStar. The Eurocopter EC130 is a derivative of the AS350 airframe and is considered by the manufacturer to be part of the Écureuil single-engine family.

Development
In the early 1970s, Aérospatiale initiated a development programme to produce a replacement for the aging Aérospatiale Alouette II. While the Aérospatiale Gazelle, which had been developed in the 1960s and 1970s, had been met with numerous orders by military customers, commercial sales of the type had been less than anticipated, thus the need for a civil-oriented development was identified.

The development of the new rotorcraft, which was headed by Chief Engineer René Mouille, was focused on the production of an economic and cost-effective aerial vehicle, thus both Aérospatiale's Production and Procurement departments were heavily involved in the design process. One such measure was the use of a rolled sheet structure, a manufacturing technique adapted from the automotive industry; another innovation was the newly developed Starflex main rotor. It was also decided that both civil and military variants of the emergent helicopter would be developed to conform with established military requirements.

On 27 June 1974, the first prototype, an AS350C powered by a Lycoming LTS101 turboshaft engine, conducted its maiden flight at Marignane, France; the second prototype, powered by a Turbomeca Arriel 1A, following on 14 February 1975. The Arriel-powered version, the AS350B, intended for sale throughout the world except for North America, was certified in France on 27 October 1977, while the Lycoming powered AS350C (or AStar) was certified by the US Federal Aviation Administration on 21 December 1977. In March 1978, deliveries to customers began for the AS350B, deliveries of the AS350C began in April 1978.

Over time, the AS350 Écureuil/AStar has received further development; while the aircraft's design remains broadly similar, aspects such as the rotor system, powerplants, and avionics have been progressively improved. On 6 February 1987, a prototype AS350 B2 flew with a fenestron tail-rotor in the place of its conventional counterpart. On 1 March 1997, the first AS350 B3, equipped with an Arriel 2B engine, performed its first flight.

Conversion programs and addons for AS350s have been produced and are offered by third-party 'aftermarket' aerospace firms in addition to those available directly from the type's prime manufacturer. Variants of the Arriel-powered AS350B, AS350 BA, AS350 B1, AS350 B2, and AS350 B3, were progressively introduced; the later B3 differing from preceding models by the increasing use of digital systems, such as the Garmin-built G500H avionics suite and FADEC engine control system.

Prior to 2013, the type had been manufactured principally at Eurocopter's Marignane facility, near Marseille, France; Eurocopter opted to, as part of a move to disperse its helicopter production activities, begin AS350 production and final assembly activities at its factory in Columbus, Mississippi, for deliveries to U.S. commercial helicopter market. The Astar has been Eurocopter's biggest-selling product in the US commercial market, at one point selling roughly one AS350 every business day. In March 2015, the first Columbus-assembled AS350 B3e received its FAA certification. In December 2015, Airbus Helicopters reported their intention to double the rate of AS350 production at Columbus in 2016 over the previous year, and that the facility is capable of producing up to 65 AS350s per year.

Design
The AS350 is a single engine helicopter, powered either by a Lycoming LTS101 or Turbomeca Arriel powerplant (for twin-engined variants, see Eurocopter AS355), that drives a three-blade main rotor, which is furnished with a Starflex rotor head. The type is known for its high-altitude performance and has seen use by operators in such environments. Both the main and tail rotors make use of composite material and are designed to minimize corrosion and maintenance requirements.

The AS350 was also developed to comply with the noise requirements in place in locations such as national parks; the in-cabin noise levels are such that passengers may also readily converse during flight. The aircraft can also be quickly started up and shut down, which is often useful during emergency medical services roles. It is equipped with hydraulically-assisted flight controls; these controls remain operational, albeit operated with greater physical effort, in the event of a hydraulic failure.

Much of the AS350's avionics are provided by Garmin, such as the GI 106A course-deviation indicator, GNS 430 VHF/VOR/localizer/glideslope indicator/Global Positioning System receiver, GTX 327 Mode A and C transponder, and GMA 340H intercom. The Vehicle and Engine Multifunction Display (VEMD) and the First Limit Indicator (FLI) both serve to increase the aircraft's safety during flight, reducing the number of gauges that need to be monitored by the pilot and thereby reducing their workload. For increased smoothness in flight, which positively affects passenger comfort as well as safety, stability augmentation systems can be installed. Later-production aircraft feature new avionics and systems such as the integration of an Automatic Flight Control System (AFCS) and autopilot, a glass cockpit featuring three liquid-crystal displays (LCDs) and digital avionics, such as the synthetic-vision terrain mapping system and Airbus's Multibloc center console upon which radios may be mounted.

The AS350 has proven popular in a range of roles; multiple cabin configurations can be used, between four and six passengers in a typical seating configuration, and large sliding doors can be fitted to either side of the cabin. In some operators' fleets, the furnishings of the cabin has been designed to enable the internal space and/or equipment fit-out to be rapidly reconfigured to enable aircraft to be switched between roles.

Public service operators, such as those in law enforcement, often have forward looking infrared (FLIR) cameras and other mission systems installed on their aircraft. Other optional equipment on offer to operates had included real-time data links, rescue hoists, underslung cargo hooks, electrical external mirrors, search lights, tactical consoles, night vision goggle-compatibility, moving-map system, internal cabin tie-downs, second battery kit, sand filters, wire strike protection system, 4-channel radio, tail rotor arch, cabin floor windows, and removable seats.Modern aircraft have refinements beyond those featuring on older models; these changes include dual-channel FADEC-equipped engines, increasing use of digital avionics in the cockpit, decreased maintenance costs, a re-designed cabin, and a comfortable Stylence interior (optional). Older aircraft often undergo refurbishment programs to install aftermarket features, or for the addition of functionality common to newer production aircraft, such as retrofitting of the glass cockpit.

Operational history

The AS350 AStar has been successful in the US market, having become the most popular helicopter platform in use with American governmental agencies, law enforcement being a typical use of the type, by 2015. By 1999, the AS350 had become the prime helicopter being used by the United States Customs Service for light enforcement operations; by 2007, the agency had become the single largest operator of the type in the world. By 2012, out of the 3,300 AS350s in operation across the world, 783 of them were in service with American-based operators.

In the Russian market since 2006, the AS350 and other helicopters built by the manufacturer have been sold and supported by wholly owned subsidiary Eurocopter Vostok; UTair Aviation soon emerged as the largest Russian operator of the AS350 B3e with a fleet of at least 20 of the type.

In December 2014, EASA validation was issued for Airbus Helicopters China to conduct training and support activity at their facility in Shenzhen, China; various components of the AS350 (such as the main and tail gearboxes) are now maintained locally. On 9 September 2015, China's first helicopter leasing company, CM International Financial Leasing Corp Ltd (CMIFL), placed an order for 100 Ecureuil-series helicopters, these are to be a mix of H125 and H130 helicopters.

Brazil has been an extensive operator of the AS350; by 2011 more than 300 helicopters were operating in the country, including from the flight deck of the Brazilian aircraft carrier São Paulo. Since 1984, the Brazilian Navy has used AS350s to support the Brazilian Antarctic Program. Helibras, a wholly owned subsidiary of Eurocopter, operates in the country; of the 600 helicopters it had domestically manufactured for the Brazilian market by 2012, 70% were AS350s. In January 2011, Helibras signed a contract with the Brazilian Army to substantially upgrade and refurbish their existing fleet of 36 AS350 Ecureuils.

In the United Kingdom, the Defence Helicopter Flying School operated 26 AS350, designated Squirrel HT1, for the training of pilots of Britain's armed forces; the type was introduced from 1997 onwards as a replacement for the Aérospatiale Gazelle. In September 2014, the UK's Ministry of Defence issued a request for proposals to replace the Squirrel HT1; Airbus Helicopters has already announced its intention to offer a mixed fleet of Eurocopter EC130s and Eurocopter EC135s in response. Since May 1984, the Royal Australian Navy's Fleet Air Arm has operated a fleet of AS350s, these were upgraded to the AS350 BA standard in 1995; the Royal Australian Air Force had previously operated the AS350 for training purposes, and briefly for search and rescue missions, but these were later transferred to the Australian Army.

Between June 2007 and December 2007, the Danish Air Force operated a deployment of four AS350 helicopters at Basra International Airport, Iraq, to perform liaison and reconnaissance missions in support of coalition forces during the Iraq War. In June 2015, the Argentine Defense Ministry ordered 12 H125s to replace their 1970s era Aérospatiale SA 315B Lamas for para-public support missions, such as search and rescue operations, inside Argentina. By June 2020, 3,663 H125 were operational, the largest number of any type.

Variants

AS350
Prototype.
AS350 Firefighter
Fire fighting version.

Powered by one Turbomeca Arriel 1B engine.
AS350 B1
Improved version of the original AS350B, which is powered by one Arriel 1D engine, type also fitted with AS355 main rotor blades, AS355 tail rotor with tabs and a tail rotor servo.

Higher gross weight version powered by one Arriel 1D1 engine over the B1 version with aerodynamic strake fitted to tail boom along the starboard side and angled engine exhaust duct for better yaw control.

High-performance version, is powered by an Arriel 2B engine equipped with a single channel Digital Engine Control Unit (DECU) with a mechanical backup system. This helicopter is the first ever to land on the summit of Mount Everest. AS350 B3/2B1 variant introduces enhanced engine with dual channel Full Authority Digital Engine Control (FADEC), dual hydraulics and a 2,370 kg (5,225 lb) Maximum Take Off Weight. AS350 B3e (introduced late 2011) equipped with the Arriel 2D engine; AS350 B3e renamed H125.

Powered by an Arriel 1B engine and fitted with wider chord AS355 main rotor blades and tail rotor servo.
AS350 BB
AS350 B2 variant selected to meet rotary-wing training needs of UK MoD, through its Defence Helicopter Flying School in 1996. Powered by a derated Arriel 1D1 engine to improve the helicopters' life cycle.
Eurocopter Squirrel HT.1
Designation of AS350BB operated by the British Military, through the Defence Helicopter Flying School as a training helicopter.
Eurocopter Squirrel HT.2
Designation of AS350BB operated by the British Army Air Corps as a training helicopter, based at Middle Wallop. Now retired.
AS350 C
Initial variant of Lycoming LTS-101-600A2 powered version developed for the North American market as the AStar.  Quickly superseded by AS350D.
AS350 D
Powered by one Lycoming LTS-101 engine for the North American market as the AStar.  At one stage marketed as AStar 'Mark III.'
AS350 L1
Military derivative of AS350 B1, powered by a 510kW (684shp) Turbomeca Arriel 1D turboshaft engine. Superseded by AS350 L2.
AS350 L2
Military derivative of AS350 B2, powered by a 546 kW (732shp) Turbomeca Arriel 1D1 turboshaft engine. Designation superseded by AS550 C2.
HB350 B Esquilo
Unarmed military version for the Brazilian Air Force. Brazilian designations CH-50 and TH-50. Built under licence by Helibras in Brazil.
HB350 B1 Esquilo
Unarmed military version for the Brazilian Navy. Brazilian designation UH-12. Built under licence by Helibras in Brazil.
HB350 L1
Armed military version for the Brazilian Army. Brazilian designation HA-1. Built under licence by Helibras in Brazil.

Aftermarket conversions
Soloy SD1, Super D
AS350 BA, D powered by an LTS101-600A-3A engine.
Soloy AllStar
AS350 BA powered by a Rolls-Royce 250-C30 engine.
Soloy SD2
AS350 B2 powered by an LTS101-700D-2 engine.
Heli-Lynx 350FX1
AS350 BA powered by an LTS101-600A-3A engine.
Heli-Lynx 350FX2
AS350 BA or AS350 B2 powered by an LTS101-700D-2 engine.
Otech AS350BA+
AS350 BA powered by an LTS101-600A-3A engine.

Operators
The AS350 is in service around the world operated by private individuals, airline and charter operators, emergency medical teams, governments and law enforcement agencies.

Military and government operators

 
 Argentine National Gendarmerie
 Buenos Aires Province Police
 
 Austrian Federal Police

 Bolivian Air Force

 Botswana Defence Force Air Wing

Brazilian Air Force
 Brazilian Navy
 Ibama
 São Paulo State Police
 Minas Gerais State Police

Burkina Faso Air Force

Royal Cambodian Air Force

Calgary Police Service
Edmonton Police Service
Royal Canadian Mounted Police

 Central African Republic Air Force

Chadian Air Force

 OK-DSW, man. no.: 7545

 Chilean Army
 Chilean Navy
 Investigations Police of Chile

Royal Danish Air Force

 Ecuadorian Army

Egyptian Air Force

National Gendarmerie

 Gabonese Air Force

 Ministry of Internal Affairs

Greenland
 Air Greenland

Guatemalan Air Force

Guinea Air Force

Hungarian Air Force 

Icelandic Coast Guard

Municipal Government of Mimika Regency

Israel Police

Royal Jordanian Air Force

Kenya Air Force

Lesotho Defence Force – 3 in service as of January 2019.

 The Malagasy Air Force received three second-hand AS350B2s in June 2019.

 Malawi Army Air Wing

Namibian Police Force

Nepalese Army Air Service

 Pakistan Army Aviation

 Paraguayan Air Force
 Paraguayan Naval Aviation

Philippine National Police

 Ministry of Internal Administration (National Emergency and Civil Protection Authority) - 4 helicopters purchased in 2006, one crashed in 2015.

 Qatar Ministry of Defence — 1 in service, 15 more on order as of January 2019.

 Russian Air Force

 South African Police Service
South African National Parks Air Wing

 Uzbekistan Air and Air Defence Forces
 
Empire Test Pilots School 

Alaska State Troopers
Anaheim Police Department
Baltimore County Police Department
California Highway Patrol
Flagler County Fire Rescue
Los Angeles County Sheriff's Department
Los Angeles Police Department
Jefferson County Sheriff's Department, Birmingham, AL
Memphis Police Department
Metropolitan Police Department - Washington D.C.
Miami Police Department
Miami-Dade Police Department
Oakland County Sheriff's Office
Oklahoma City Police Department
Orange County Sheriff’s Department

Philadelphia Police Department
 Pinellas County Sheriff’s Office
Placer County Sheriff's Office
Phoenix Police Department
San Diego Police Department
San Jose Police Department
Suffolk County Police Department
U.S. Customs and Border Protection

Ministry of Internal Affairs

Retired

 Royal Australian Navy

 Defence Helicopter Flying School

Notable accidents and incidents
On February 22, 1995, Massachusetts State Police helicopter N20SP carrying two troopers and two AT&T engineers crashed into the yacht club building. All on board died in the crash, which was attributed to significant operating deficiencies within the Police Air Wing which allowed contamination of the fuel bunker to go undetected.
On 27 July 2007, two AS-350 AStar helicopters from television stations KNXV-TV and KTVK collided in mid-air over Phoenix, Arizona, while covering a police pursuit.
 On 15 September 2007, former World Rally Championship driver Colin McRae and three passengers were killed when his AS350 B2 Squirrel, which he was piloting, crashed near Lanark, Scotland.
 On 8 August 2009, a Piper PA-32R collided with an AS350 over the Hudson River, with both aircraft crashing into the Hudson River. There were no survivors.
 On 10 June 2012, an AS350 B3e belonging to the Kenya Police Air Wing crashed in Kibiku area in Ngong Forest, west of Nairobi, Kenya, killing at least six people, including Kenya's Interior Security Minister George Saitoti and his deputy Orwa Ojode.
On March 30, 2013, an Alaska State Troopers AS350 B3 N911AA impacted terrain while maneuvering during a search and rescue flight near Talkeetna, Alaska. All 3 onboard died.
 On 7 June 2014, a Helibrás HB-350BA crashed after takeoff, in Aruanã, Goiás state, Brazil. All on board died, including retired football player Fernandão.
 On 9 March 2015, two AS350 B3 collided mid air in La Rioja Province, Argentina, killing all 10 people on board both aircraft. The passengers, including a number of French athletes, were participants in the filming of French reality television program Dropped.
 On 5 May 2016, an AS350 registered as RP-C 6828 crashed in Sebuyau, Sarawak killing all 6 people including Malaysia Deputy Minister of Plantation Industries and Commodities, Noriah Kasnon and her husband, and Member of Parliament for Kuala Kangsar, Wan Mohammad Khair-il Anuar.
 On 11 March 2018, an AS350 N350LH operated by Liberty Helicopters carrying six people (five passengers and a pilot) crashed into New York City's East River after reportedly suffering engine failure. All five passengers were confirmed dead after the aircraft submerged upside down into the water. The pilot was able to free himself and was rescued by a nearby tugboat.
 On 27 February 2019, an Air Dynasty AS350 B3e helicopter crashed shortly after takeoff in Taplejung, Nepal, killing all seven people on board, including Tourism and Civil Aviation Minister Rabindra Adhikari.
In response to the accident, Airbus made crash-resistant fuel systems part of the standard kit for the aircraft on 1 October.
 On 7 March 2021, an AS350 carrying billionaire French politician and industrialist Olivier Dassault crashed on takeoff near Deauville (Normandy) with no survivors.
 On 27 March 2021, an AS350 carrying Czech billionaire Petr Kellner crashed at Knik Glacier (Alaska), killing five.
 On 1 November 2022, an AS350 B3 operated by Midtnorsk Helikopterservice crashed just outside the centre of Verdal, Trøndelag, Norway. Two people died, and one person, the pilot, survived.

Specifications (AS350 B3)

See also

References

Citations

Bibliography

 Hoyle, Craig. "World Air Forces Directory". Flight International. Vol 180 No 5321, 13–19 December 2011. pp. 26–52.

 Jackson, Paul. Jane's All The World's Aircraft 2003–2004. Coulsdon, Surry, UK: Jane's Information Group, 2003. .
 Lucchesi, Claudio. "Brazilian Police Air Unit: São Paulo's Police Eagles". Air International, June 2000, Vol. 58, No. 6. pp. 376–378. 
 Ripley, Tim. Middle East Air Power in the 21st Century. Casemate Publishers, 2010. .
 Taylor, John W. R. Jane's All The World's Aircraft 1982–83. London: Jane's Yearbooks, 1982. .
 Taylor, Michael J. H. Brassey's World Aircraft & Systems Directory 1999/2000. London: Brassey's, 1999. .
Board, N. T. S., 2017. Loss of Control at Takeoff, Air Methods Corporation, Airbus Helicopters AS350 B3e, N390LG, Frisco, Colorado, July 3, 2015, Washington, DC: National Transportation Safety Board.

External links

 Eurocopter's AS350 B2 page
 Eurocopter's AS350 B3 page

Airbus Helicopters aircraft
Aérospatiale aircraft
1970s French helicopters
1970s French civil utility aircraft
Single-turbine helicopters
Aircraft first flown in 1974